Durham Motorway Services are at junction 61 on the A1 (M), six miles from Durham City between the villages of Bowburn and Coxhoe in County Durham, England. Opened in 1994 by David Bellamy, the site operates high street brands such as McDonald's, Costa Coffee, WHSmith and on site hotel Days Inn. In 2019, the site opened a McDonald's Drive Thru, the first on the UK motorway network and created an extra 20 jobs in team members, management and customer service.

References

External links 
 Motorway Services Information - Durham
 Motorway Services Online - Durham

RoadChef motorway service stations
A1(M) motorway service stations
Transport in County Durham